Dipterygina babooni is a moth of the family Noctuidae. It is found in New South Wales, Queensland and Papua New Guinea.

External links
Australian Faunal Directory

Hadeninae